Heřmaničky is a municipality and village in Benešov District in the Central Bohemian Region of the Czech Republic. It has about 700 inhabitants.

Administrative parts
Villages of Arnoštovice, Číšťovice, Dědkov, Durdice, Jestřebice, Jiříkovec, Jíví, Karasova Lhota, Křenovičky, Loudilka, Peklo and Velké Heřmanice are administrative parts of Heřmaničky.

Gallery

References

Villages in Benešov District